KLNO (94.1 FM) is a Regional Mexican music formatted radio station broadcasting to the Dallas/Fort Worth metroplex in Texas.  The station's studios are located in the Univision 23 Studios in the Arts District in Downtown Dallas.

This signal was created in 1981 when then owner Marcos Rodriguez, Sr. successfully petitioned the FCC to change the frequency of KESS 93.9 to 94.1 and permit a move to the Cedar Hill, Texas antenna farm. His son, Marcos A. Rodriguez, controlled this frequency from 1986 to 1999.

In 1964, Marcos Rodriguez, Sr. was hired by Mike Bradley and became the first full-time employee of 93.9 (then owned by John Walton and called KBUY-FM). John Walton purchased KBUY when it was called KCUL. Its call letters came from the backwards spelling of the original owner's name - Dr. L.H. Luck.

The station was assigned the KLNO call letters by the Federal Communications Commission on February 15, 2000.

Sometime in early 2014, KLNO (alongside other Univision-owned stations) has dropped its "La Que Buena" branding in favor of using the frequency as its name. This was done until 2016 when it returned to its branding.

KLNO broadcasts in HD.

References

External links
La Que Buena 94.1 FM

 DFW Radio/TV History
DFW Radio Archives

Regional Mexican radio stations in the United States
LNO
LNO
Radio stations established in 1961
Univision Radio Network stations